Ricardi is an Italian language surname. It stems from the male given name Ricardo – and may refer to:
Pablo Ricardi (1962), Argentine chess player
Nico Ricardi (1982), Indonesian artist

References 

Italian-language surnames
Patronymic surnames
Surnames from given names